Crossroads  is a 1998 Russian/Belarusian  romantic film directed by Dmitry Astrakhan.

Plot 
The film tells about the participants of the once successful rock band Uncle Alik, who now work part-time at weddings, in the club and underpass. And suddenly the leader of the group Alik meets an old friend who offers to arrange a concert in America.

Cast 
 Leonid Yarmolnik as Oleg 'Alik' Sevastyanov
 Anna Legchilova as Lyalya  
  Aleksandr Efremov  as Misha
 Olga Samoshina as Natasha
 Olga Belyayeva as Lusya
 Viktoriya Ershova as girl

Soundtrack 
 Overture — Andrey Makarevich
 Crossroads —  Makarevich
 Where is it Worn — Makarevich  
 We Will Be Together — Makarevich
 Let Me Go — Makarevich
 By Appointment —  Makarevich
 We'll be Together — instrumental
 Crossroads — Yuri Ilchenko
 Where is it Now — Ilchenko 
 We Will Be Together Your —  Ilchenko
 Let Me Go — Ilchenko
 By Appointment — Ilchenko
 Coda

References

External links 
 

1998 films
1990s Russian-language films
1998 romantic comedy-drama films
Films directed by Dmitry Astrakhan
Belarusfilm films
Russian romantic comedy-drama films
Belarusian comedy films
Films set in Moscow
Films about singers
Belarusian drama films